In printing and graphic arts, mixing of two dissimilar colors in two adjacent printed dots before they dry and absorb in substrate is referred to as color bleeding. Unless it is done for effect, color bleeding reduces print quality.

Prior art applied this term to the phenomenon of single color ink following the fibers of the paper.

The amount of bleeding is affected by numerous factors, including the paper type, paper's characteristics of ink absorption and its capillary action, ink type and properties (speed of ink drying), printing technology (i.e. nozzle design and spacing with ink jet printers).

See also
 Dot gain

References

 Image bleed in color ink-jet printing of plain paper
 Color ink jet pen having nozzle group spacing to prevent color bleed

Quality issues in printing
Printing terminology